The Roman Catholic Archdiocese of Osaka (Katorikku Oosaka Daishikyouku) is an archdiocese located in the city of Osaka in Japan.

History
 March 20, 1888: Established as Apostolic Vicariate of Central Japan from the Apostolic Vicariate of Southern Japan
 June 15, 1891: Promoted as Diocese of Osaka

 June 24, 1969: Promoted as Metropolitan Archdiocese of Osaka

Leadership
 Archbishops of Osaka (Roman rite)
 Cardinal Thomas Aquino Manyo Maeda (トマス・アクィナス前田万葉) (since August 20, 2014)
 Archbishop Leo Jun Ikenaga (レオ池長潤), S.J. (May 10, 1997 – August 20, 2014)
 Archbishop Paul Hisao Yasuda (パウロ安田久雄) (November 15, 1978 – May 10, 1997)
 Cardinal Paul Yoshigoro Taguchi (パウロ田口芳五郎) (June 24, 1969 – February 23, 1978)
 Bishops of Osaka 大阪 (Roman rite) 
 Cardinal Paul Yoshigoro Taguchi (パウロ田口芳五郎) (1941.11.25 – 1969.06.24)
 Bishop Jean-Baptiste Castanier (ジャン・バティスト・カスタニエ), M.E.P. (1918.07.06 – 1940.12.03)
 Bishop Jules-Auguste Chatron (ジェル・オーグスト・シャトロン), M.E.P. (1896.07.22 – 1917.05.07)
 Bishop Henri-Caprais Vasselon (アンリ・ヴァスロン), M.E.P. (1893.08.18 – 1896.03.07)
 Bishop Félix-Nicolas-Joseph Midon (フェリックス・ニコラス・ミドン), M.E.P. (1891.06.15 – 1893.04.12)
 Vicars Apostolic of Central Japan (Roman rite) 
 Bishop Félix-Nicolas-Joseph Midon (フェリックス・ニコラス・ミドン), M.E.P. (1888.03.23 – 1891.06.15)

Suffragan dioceses
 Hiroshima 広島 
 Kyoto 京都
 Nagoya 名古屋
 Takamatsu 高松

See also
 Catholic Church in Japan

References

Sources

 GCatholic.org
 Catholic Hierarchy
  Diocese website

External links 
 Archidiocese of Osaka

Roman Catholic dioceses in Japan
Religious organizations established in 1888
Roman Catholic dioceses and prelatures established in the 19th century